Lalmani Chaudhary is a Nepali politician who is a member of the Communist Party of Nepal. He is also a former member of House of Representatives and former Moyar of Khairahani Municipality.

References 

Living people
Communist Party of Nepal (Unified Marxist–Leninist) politicians
Nepal MPs 2017–2022
Mayors of places in Nepal
Year of birth missing (living people)